

305001–305100 

|-bgcolor=#f2f2f2
| colspan=4 align=center | 
|}

305101–305200 

|-id=181
| 305181 Donelaitis ||  || Kristijonas Donelaitis (1714–1780), a Lutheran pastor who is considered one of the greatest Lithuanian poets. || 
|}

305201–305300 

|-id=238
| 305238 Maxuehui ||  || Xue-Hui Ma (born 1971) is the Director of Ken-Ting Observatory (KTO) in Taiwan. Ma has provided training courses in astronomical observation to more than 2 000 students since the establishment of KTO in the year of 2000. Under his supervision, KTO has become the best educational base in Taiwan for advanced observing technique in astronomy. || 
|-id=254
| 305254 Moron ||  || Moron, a mountain of the Jura, located north of Malleray in the canton of Bern, Switzerland. || 
|-id=287
| 305287 Olegyankov ||  || Oleg Yankov (born 1968), a Russian philanthropist. || 
|}

305301–305400 

|-bgcolor=#f2f2f2
| colspan=4 align=center | 
|}

305401–305500 

|-bgcolor=#f2f2f2
| colspan=4 align=center | 
|}

305501–305600 

|-bgcolor=#f2f2f2
| colspan=4 align=center | 
|}

305601–305700 

|-id=660
| 305660 Romyhaag ||  || Romy Haag (born 1951), a singer, actress and show star who started her career at the famous "Alcazar" in Paris. || 
|-id=661
| 305661 Joejackson ||  || Joe Jackson (born 1954, David Ian Jackson), a British musician, singer and songwriter || 
|}

305701–305800 

|-bgcolor=#f2f2f2
| colspan=4 align=center | 
|}

305801–305900 

|-bgcolor=#f2f2f2
| colspan=4 align=center | 
|}

305901–306000 

|-id=953
| 305953 Josiedubey ||  || Josie Elizabeth Chloe Jayne Dubey (born 1994), granddaughter of British discoverer Norman Falla || 
|}

References 

305001-306000